James N. Hilvert Jr. is an American football coach.  He is the head football coach at Baldwin Wallace University in Berea, Ohio, a position he had held since the 2017 season.  Hilvert served as the head football coach at Thomas More College in Crestview Hills, Kentucky for 2007 to 2014.

Head coaching record

College

References

External links
 Baldwin Wallace profile

Year of birth missing (living people)
Living people
Baldwin Wallace Yellow Jackets football coaches
Mount St. Joseph Lions football coaches
Thomas More Saints football coaches
High school football coaches in Ohio
Saint Joseph's College (Indiana) alumni
Western Michigan University alumni